The 1999 Borough Council of Wellingborough election took place on 6 May 1999 to elect members of Borough Council of Wellingborough in Northamptonshire, UK. This was on the same day as other local elections.

References

1999 English local elections
May 1999 events in the United Kingdom
2007
1990s in Northamptonshire